The Berenstain Bears' Christmas Tree is a Christmas-themed animated television special based on the Berenstain Bears children's book series by Stan and Jan Berenstain. Produced by Buzz Potamkin and directed by Mordicai Gerstein, the program made its debut on NBC on December 3, 1979. The television special inspired a book by the same name, published by Random House in 1980.

Plot

It is Christmas Eve in Bear Country and the Bear Family is decorating for Christmas, and Papa has caught a giant salmon for Christmas dinner. Now the only thing they need is the tree, for their many ornaments, which include a Santa Bear sleigh, strings of beads, a musical singing bear, and a glittery bright Christmas Tree star with eighteen points.

Mama suggests Papa and the cubs get a tree from Grizzly Gus' lot, but she reminds them to return home as soon as they can since a snowstorm is likely. Papa, however, scoffs at Mama's weather prediction and decides he can do better than what Grizzly Gus has to offer, and the three head out into the mountains to find the right tree for them.

The first tree they find is in good shape, but it is home to a skunk, some squirrels, a grouse, a chipmunk, and twenty-six crows, who chase them off. But, from their point of view, Christmas is a time for them to celebrate as well, thus forcing them to find another tree.

Papa and the cubs find another tree on a cliff, but it is the home to an eagle, a hawk, a wolf, and a snowy owl who aren't too pleased that Papa wants to chop their tree down either. After narrowly avoiding the eagle's attack, the three continue through the mountains, despite the fact that it is now growing dark, and snowing heavily.

After climbing their way through the snow-covered mountains, Papa and the cubs find a third perfect-looking tree. This time, however, Papa takes a good look at the tree and sees a little window on the trunk. Inside, there is a family of snowbirds decorating a small twig like a Christmas tree. Touched by this, Papa can't bring himself to chop the birds' tree down and tells Brother and Sister that Christmas is the time to be thinking of family and friends.

The three then ski back down the mountain to Grizzly Gus's tree lot, only to find that they are completely sold out (with a small sign below reading "Happy New Year!"). They are all very sad until they find that their treehouse has been decorated by all the animals they met on their way in an act of gratitude, Mama and Papa Bear lead everyone in a Christmas carol about the Christmas star and its meaning.

On Christmas Day, as the family prepares to eat dinner, Sister asks why Papa's lesson of being considerate did not apply to the salmon they are eating. Papa jokes that the family is willing to "make an exception" for the salmon.

Cast
 Ron McLarty as Papa Bear and the Narrator
 Gabriela Glatzer as Sister Bear
 Jonathan Lewis as Brother Bear
 Pat Lysinger as Mama Bear

Development
Stan and Jan Berenstain first pitched their idea for a holiday special in November 1978. They were told that there was not a market for new animated television specials, and the husband and wife team nearly gave up on the project. In February 1979, however, they received an invitation from producer Joseph Cates to discuss the idea further.

A deal with Perpetual Motion Pictures was soon solidified, and, over the course of the next several months, the Berenstain's collaborated with Mordicai Gerstein and Buzz Potamkin to develop a script and sketch nearly 20,000 original drawings needed for the animators. The Berenstain's drew for three straight weeks, struggling with some of the sketches. According to Stan and Jan: "Back views of the bears are especially challenging (we've never seen them from the back before)".

Soon after, the Berenstain's auditioned for vocal talent: 
Auditioning voices: we listen to eight Papas, six Mamas and four-and-twenty Sister and Brother Bears in six hours. Actors are selected. Two days in the space station atmosphere of a high-powered sound recording studio: sound engineer Bob Lifton laughs at two of the show's ninety-seven jokes. Since he does sound for Saturday Night Live this is considered a good omen.

By mid-June, Stan and Jan saw the first bits of animation, and the completed special was viewed by the Berenstain's on November 10, just over three weeks prior to the national broadcast.

Production and casting
The 25-minute special was created and written by Stan and Jan Berenstain and featured original music composed and conducted by Emmy-winning musician Elliot Lawrence, with lyrics provided by Stan Berenstain. The score included three original songs: "Christmas Day is Here (It's Almost Here)", "We Need a Tree for Christmas", and "The Christmas Star".

The Christmas special starred Ron McLarty (billed as Ron McLarity), Gabriela Glatzer, Jonathan Lewis, and Pat Lysinger as Papa, Sister, Brother, and Mama Bear, respectively. McLarty also doubled as the show's narrator.

It was the first of five Berenstain Bears animated specials that aired on NBC from 1979 to 1983. Lawrence and Berenstain would provide music and lyrics for each of four subsequent Berenstain Bears NBC specials. Most of the voice actors reprised their roles in future specials, as well.

Premiere and reception
The program premiered on NBC on December 3, 1979, at 8:00 PM ET (pre-empting Little House on the Prairie). The broadcast was sponsored by Kellogg's and competed against 240-Robert on ABC and The White Shadow on CBS.

Alexis Greene, writing for The New York Times, called the special "charming", and noted its "imaginative" animation.

Book adaptation

The plot of the storybook, published by Random House in 1980, closely follows the storyline of the television special. The Random House edition remained in print for nearly three decades until a newer storybook version was released by Zondervan in 2009. As part of the "Berenstain Bears Living Lights" series, this new edition generally follows the original plot, but focuses more closely on the Christian aspect of the holiday, including depictions of a manger scene and several Bible verses in the updated text.

Home media releases
In 1984, Embassy Home Entertainment released the special in Betamax format, as well as on LaserDisc as a double-feature with The Berenstain Bears Meet Bigpaw, called "A Berenstain Bears Celebration". In 1987, the special was made available on VHS by Embassy Home Entertainment as part of the "Children's Treasures" series. In 1989, the special was distributed on VHS by Kids Klassics. In 2002, the special was released on DVD by Good Times, also in a double-feature with The Berenstain Bears Meet Bigpaw. In 2008, Sony Wonder also released the special on DVD. In this edition, the Christmas special was bundled with four bonus episodes from the 1980s cartoon series.

References

External links

"The Diary of a Christmas Special" by Stan and Jan Berenstain
"Berenstain Bears Christmas Books and Memorabilia"
Berenstain Bears Official Website
The Berenstain Bears' Christmas Tree full video

1970s animated television specials
NBC television specials
1979 in American television
1979 television specials
1970s American television specials
Animated films about bears
Berenstain Bears
American television shows based on children's books
American Christmas films
NBC network original films
American Christmas television specials
1979 films
Animated Christmas television specials